Konstantin Fedorovich Popovich (1924–2010) was a Ukrainian and Moldovan literary critic, folklorist, writer, publicist, Doctor of Philology (1974), Professor (1988), Academician of the Academy of Sciences of Moldova (1995), member of the Writers' Unions of Ukraine and Moldova, and Honored Scientist of Moldova (1984).

References 
 

1924 births
2010 deaths
Soviet people of World War II
Chernivtsi University alumni
Ukrainian writers
Ukrainian journalists
Ukrainian people of Moldovan descent
People from Chernivtsi Oblast